"Soily" is a song written by Paul McCartney in 1971. It was included in the setlist of his band Wings during their 1972 tour of Europe and their 1973 tour of Britain. In 1973 it was the first song of the set. It was then reworked and a faster, heavier version was played during Wings' World Tour of 1975–76. In the British leg of this tour, it ended the rock part of the set, after which Wings played a number of acoustic songs before returning to electric music. From the Australian leg (November 1975) up to the end of the tour (October 1976), "Soily" served as an encore although it was not played during every concert.

Recording
At least seven takes of "Soily" were recorded in 1974 at Abbey Road Studios for inclusion in the unreleased Wings film One Hand Clapping. These takes featured drummer Geoff Britton, and several can now be found in unofficial bootlegged versions.

Later release
"Soily" appears on the 1976 live album Wings over America and was released as the B-side of the single "Maybe I'm Amazed" in 1977. This version was recorded on 7 June 1976 at McNichols Sports Arena in Denver. A performance from One Hand Clapping can be seen on a DVD included with the 2010 remastered special edition of the Wings album Band on the Run, and on the bonus disc of Venus and Mars (Collector's Edition).

A live recording from Berlin 1972 is included in the CD box set Wings 1971–73, released in 2018.

References

1977 singles
Paul McCartney songs
Paul McCartney and Wings songs
Apple Records singles
Songs written by Paul McCartney
Songs written by Linda McCartney
Song recordings produced by Paul McCartney
Music published by MPL Music Publishing
1976 songs